Gennady Ivanovich Ivanov (1947 – 1982), known as The Gorky Maniac, was a Soviet serial killer, rapist and robber, active during 1980 in the city of Gorky.

In most murders, he killed his victims by inflicting numerous blows with a knife, including one to the neck, which caused the victim's death.

Biography 
Gennady Ivanov was born in 1947 in the Chuvash ASSR, and later served in Baikonur as part of a secret military service. After demobilization, approximately in 1973, he committed his first murder during a domestic quarrel, for which he was sentenced to 10 years in prison. He collaborated with the colony's administration, and thanks to denunciations, in 1980, 7 years after his conviction, he was granted parole. He got a job at GAZ, but soon quit, beginning to commit crimes in the autumn of 1980.

The first instance was at night, when Ivanov tried to rape a girl named Anna Kovaleva, but she was saved by passers-by. That same night, he made another unsuccessful attack on another girl. The second victim received several knife wounds, but survived and was able to describe her assailant. After two weeks, Ivanov raped and killed Nina Sinitsyna, stealing 200 rubles from her. With this money, he bought himself new clothes, and, pretending to be a public toilet cleaner, entered a cubicle and changed his bloodied clothing. A few days later, Ivanov killed a man and took his shoes, leaving his own at the crime scene. On the same day, he killed another man, Konstantin Aleksandrov, stealing 1100 rubles and another pair of shoes from his victim.

A few weeks later, he attacked two girls who were using a payphone. One of them, 28-year-old Nadezhda Slepova, was killed by the suffered knife wounds. The second girl, although heavily injured, was able to escape, but died from her wounds at the hospital. Before her death, the victim managed to describe her assailant.

Soon after, Ivanov killed a WWII veteran, which spread panic around the city. Later, in the village of Vurnary in the Chuvash ASSR, he killed a woman during a domestic quarrel. On that same day, he committed another rape, after which he was detained. During a search on his home, women's jewelry belonging to his victims were located in his home.

During interrogations, Ivanov constantly called himself "The King" - now in the jungle, now in the underworld. He was sentenced to death by firing squad, and in 1982, the sentence was carried out.

In the media 
 Documentary film from the series "The investigation was conducted..." - "The king of the jungle"
 Documentary film from the series "Legends of the Soviet Investigation" - "Operation 'The Beast'"

See also
 List of Russian serial killers

References 
 Documentary film from the series "The investigation was conducted..." - "The king of the jungle"
 Documentary film from the series "Legends of the Soviet Investigation" - "Operation 'The Beast'"

1947 births
1982 deaths
Executed Soviet serial killers
Male serial killers
People executed by the Soviet Union by firearm
People executed for murder
People from Chuvashia
Soviet people convicted of murder
Soviet rapists